Alton Downs Airport (IATA:AWN, ICAO:YADS) is a small, privately owned airport in Alton Downs, South Australia.

Facilities 
The airport has one dirt runway with a heading of around 17/35.

See also
List of airports in South Australia

References 

Airports in South Australia
Far North (South Australia)
Privately owned airports